Antonio Maria Lucchini or Luchini (Venice, c. 1690 – Venice, before 1730) was an Italian librettist.  His texts were set to music by Antonio Vivaldi, Baldassare Galuppi, Leonardo Vinci, and Rinaldo di Capua, among others.

Libretti
Foca superbo (set to music by Antonio Lotti, 1716)
Tieteberga (set to music by Antonio Vivaldi, 1717)
Giove in Argo (set to music by Antonio Lotti, 1717; set to music by Georg Friedrich Händel, 1739; set to music by Carl Heinrich Graun, 1747)
Ascanio ovvero Gli odi delusi dal sangue (set to music by Antonio Lotti, 1718)
L'inganno tradito dall'amore (set to music by Antonio Caldara, 1720)
Ermengarda (set to music by Tomaso Albinoni, 1723)
Gli sforzi d'ambizione e d'amore (set to music by Giovanni Porta, 1724)
Farnace (set to music by Leonardo Vinci, 1724; set to music by Antonio Vivaldi, 1727; set to music by Francesco Corselli, 1739; set to music by Rinaldo di Capua, 1739; set to music by Giuseppe Arena, 1742; set to music by Pietro Alessandro Guglielmi, 1765)
Dorilla in Tempe (set to music by Antonio Vivaldi, 1726)
Gl'odi delusi dal sangue (set to music by Baldassare Galuppi e Giovanni Battista Pescetti, 1728)
L'osservanza della divina legge nel martirio de’ Maccabei (set to music by Francesco Bartolomeo Conti, 1732)
Il martiro della madre de’ Maccabei (set to music by Francesco Bartolomeo Conti, 1736)
Sant’Elena al Calvario (set to music by Francesco Bartolomeo Conti, 1736)
Various madrigal texts

Italian opera librettists
1690s births
1730s deaths
Italian male dramatists and playwrights